The Ram class was a ship class of two minelayers built in the Dutch East Indies for the Government Navy. However, before the minelayers could be completed the Dutch East Indies was invaded by the Japanese. As a result, the ships were completed as gunboats by the Japanese and taken into service of the Imperial Japanese Navy.

History
The Ram class minelayers were originally built for the Government Navy. While the ships were still being built the Japanese invaded the Dutch East Indies. To prevent capture or destruction several measures were taken, such as towing the incomplete Ram to Tjilatjap in December 1941. As the invasion progressed and the Dutch were forced to retreat it was decided in March 1942 to destroy both ships.

Design and construction
The two minelayers of the Ram class were built at different shipyards in the Dutch East Indies. Ram was built at the Droogdok Maatschappij Tandjong Priok, while Regulus was built at Droogdok Maatschappij Soerabaja. It was estimated that the construction of the ships would take one and a half years to be completed. The ships were at the time the largest ships to be built in the Dutch East Indies. Besides being minelayers, the ships could also function as seaplane tender.

Armament
When it came to armaments the Ram class minelayers were to be equipped with two 7.5 cm cannons, two 40 mm machine guns, 80 mines and 25 depth charges.

Ships in class

Notes

Citations

References

Ram-class minelayers
Mine warfare vessel classes